Breddin is a municipality in the Ostprignitz-Ruppin district, in Brandenburg, Germany.

Demography

References

Localities in Ostprignitz-Ruppin